, or Fugaku, located on the island of Honshū, is the highest mountain in Japan, with a summit elevation of . It is the second-highest volcano located on an island in Asia (after Mount Kerinci on the island of Sumatra), and seventh-highest peak of an island on Earth. Mount Fuji is an active stratovolcano that last erupted from 1707 to 1708. Mount Fuji's exceptionally symmetrical cone, which is covered in snow for about five months of the year, is commonly used as a cultural icon of Japan and it is frequently depicted in art and photography, as well as visited by sightseers, hikers and mountain climbers.

Mount Fuji is one of Japan's  along with Mount Tate and Mount Haku. It is a Special Place of Scenic Beauty and one of Japan's Historic Sites. It was added to the World Heritage List as a Cultural Site on June 22, 2013. According to UNESCO, Mount Fuji has "inspired artists and poets and been the object of pilgrimage for centuries". UNESCO recognizes 25 sites of cultural interest within the Mount Fuji locality. These 25 locations include the mountain and the Shinto shrine, Fujisan Hongū Sengen Taisha.

Etymology 

However, the origins of this spelling and of the name Fuji continue to be debated.

British missionary John Batchelor (1855–1944) argued that the name is from the Ainu word for "fire" (fuchi) of the fire deity Kamui Fuchi, which was denied by a Japanese linguist Kyōsuke Kindaichi on the grounds of phonetic development (sound change). It is also pointed out that huchi means an "old woman" and ape is the word for "fire", ape huchi kamuy being the fire deity. Research on the distribution of place names that include fuji as a part also suggest the origin of the word fuji is in the Yamato language rather than Ainu.

Modern linguist Alexander Vovin proposes an alternative hypothesis based on Old Japanese reading : the word may have been borrowed from Eastern Old Japanese  火主 meaning "fire master".

Variations 
In English, the mountain is known as Mount Fuji. Some sources refer to it as "Fuji-san", "Fujiyama" or, redundantly, "Mt. Fujiyama". Japanese speakers refer to the mountain as "Fuji-san". This "san" is not the honorific suffix used with people's names, such as Watanabe-san, but the Sino-Japanese reading of the character  used in Sino-Japanese compounds. In Nihon-shiki and Kunrei-shiki romanization, the name is transliterated as Huzi.

History 

Mount Fuji is an attractive volcanic cone and a frequent subject of Japanese art especially after 1600, when Edo (now Tokyo) became the capital and people saw the mountain while traveling on the Tōkaidō road. According to the historian H. Byron Earhart, "in medieval times it eventually came to be seen by Japanese as the “number one” mountain of the known world of the three countries of India, China, and Japan". The mountain is mentioned in Japanese literature throughout the ages and is the subject of many poems.

The summit has been thought of as sacred since ancient times and was therefore forbidden to women. It was not until 1872 that the Japanese government issued an edict (May 4, 1872, Grand Council of State Edict 98) stating, "Any remaining practices of female exclusion on shrine and temple lands shall be immediately abolished, and mountain climbing for the purpose of worship, etc., shall be permitted.” However, Tatsu Takayama (also known as Takayama Tatsu), a Japanese woman, became the first woman on record to summit Mount Fuji in the fall of 1832.

Ancient samurai used the base of the mountain as a remote training area, near the present-day town of Gotemba. The shōgun Minamoto no Yoritomo held yabusame archery contests in the area in the early Kamakura period.

The first ascent by a foreigner was by Sir Rutherford Alcock in September 1860, who ascended the mountain in 8 hours and descended in 3 hours. Alcock's brief narrative in The Capital of the Tycoon was the first widely disseminated description of the mountain in the West. Lady Fanny Parkes, the wife of British ambassador Sir Harry Parkes, was the first non-Japanese woman to ascend Mount Fuji in 1867. Photographer Felix Beato climbed Mount Fuji two years later.

On March 5, 1966, BOAC Flight 911, a Boeing 707, broke up in flight and crashed near the Mount Fuji Gotemba New fifth station, shortly after departure from Tokyo International Airport. All 113 passengers and 11 crew members died in the disaster, which was attributed to the extreme clear-air turbulence caused by lee waves downwind of the mountain. There is a memorial for the crash a short distance down from the Gotemba New fifth station.

Today, Mount Fuji is an international destination for tourism and mountain climbing. In the early 20th century, populist educator Frederick Starr's Chautauqua lectures about his several ascents of Mount Fuji—1913, 1919, and 1923—were widely known in America. A well-known Japanese saying suggests that a wise person will climb Mt. Fuji once in their lifetime, but only a fool would climb it twice. It remains a popular symbol in Japanese culture, including making numerous movie appearances, inspiring the Infiniti logo, and even appearing in medicine with the Mount Fuji sign.

In September 2004, the staffed weather station at the summit was closed after 72 years in operation. Observers monitored radar sweeps that detected typhoons and heavy rains.

Mount Fuji was added to the World Heritage List as a Cultural Site on June 22, 2013.

Geography 

Mount Fuji is a very distinctive feature of the geography of Japan. It straddles the boundary of Shizuoka and Yamanashi Prefectures. Four small cities surround it: Gotemba to the east, Fujiyoshida to the north, Fujinomiya to the southwest, and Fuji to the south. It is surrounded by five lakes: Lake Kawaguchi, Lake Yamanaka, Lake Sai, Lake Motosu and Lake Shōji. They, and nearby Lake Ashi, provide views of the mountain. The mountain is part of the Fuji-Hakone-Izu National Park. It can be seen more distantly from Yokohama, Tokyo, and sometimes as far as Chiba, Saitama, Tochigi, Ibaraki and Lake Hamana when the sky is clear. It has been photographed from space during a space shuttle mission.

Climate 
The summit of Mount Fuji has a tundra climate (Köppen climate classification ET). The temperature is very low at the high altitude, and the cone is covered by snow for several months of the year. The lowest recorded temperature is  recorded in February 1981, and the highest temperature was  recorded in August 1942.

Geology 

Mount Fuji is located at a triple junction trench where the Amurian Plate, Okhotsk Plate, and Philippine Sea Plate meet. These three plates form the western part of Japan, the eastern part of Japan, and the Izu Peninsula respectively. The Pacific Plate is being subducted beneath these plates, resulting in volcanic activity. Mount Fuji is also located near three island arcs: the Southwestern Japan Arc, the Northeastern Japan Arc, and the Izu-Bonin-Mariana Arc.

Beyond this distance, slope angles are about 27°, which is caused by an increase in scoria. Mid-flank slope angles decrease from 23° to less than 10° in the piedmont.

Scientists have identified four distinct phases of volcanic activity in the formation of Mount Fuji. The first phase, called Sen-komitake, is composed of an andesite core recently discovered deep within the mountain. Sen-komitake was followed by the "Komitake Fuji", a basalt layer believed to be formed several hundred thousand years ago. Approximately 100,000 years ago, "Old Fuji" was formed over the top of Komitake Fuji. The modern, "New Fuji" is believed to have formed over the top of Old Fuji around 10,000 years ago.

After a relatively short pause, eruptions began again which formed Komitake Volcano in the same location. These eruptions ended 100,000 years ago. Mount Fuji started erupting 100,000 years ago, with Ko-Fuji (old-Fuji) forming 100,000 to 17,000 years ago, but which is now almost completely buried. A large landslide on the southwest flank occurred about 18,000 years ago. Shin-Fuji (new-Fuji) eruptions in the form of lava, lapilli and volcanic ash, have occurred between 17,000 and 8,000 years ago, between 7,000 and 3,500 years ago, and between 4,000 and 2,000 years ago. Flank eruptions, mostly in the form of parasitic cinder cones, ceased in 1707. The largest cone, Omuro-Yama, is one of more than 100 cones aligned NW-SE and NE-SW through the summit. Mt. Fuji also has more than 70 lava tunnels and extensive lava tree molds. Two large landslides are at the head of the Yoshida-Osawa and Osawa-Kuzure valleys.

, the volcano is classified as active with a low risk of eruption. The last recorded eruption was the Hōei eruption which started on December 16, 1707 (Hōei 4, 23rd day of the 11th month), and ended about January 1, 1708 (Hōei 4, 9th day of the 12th month). The eruption formed a new crater and a second peak, named Mount Hōei (after the Hōei era), halfway down its southeastern side. Fuji spewed cinders and ash which fell like rain in Izu, Kai, Sagami, and Musashi. Since then, there have been no signs of an eruption. However, on the evening of March 15, 2011, there was a magnitude 6.2 earthquake at shallow depth a few kilometres from Mount Fuji on its southern side. But according to the Japanese Meteorological Service there was no sign of any eruption.

Recorded eruptions 
About 11,000 years ago, a large amount of lava began to erupt from the west side of the top of the ancient Fuji mountain. This lava formed the new Fuji which is the main body of Mount Fuji. Since then, the tops of the ancient Fuji and the new Fuji are side by side. About 2500–2800 years ago, the top part of ancient Fuji caused a large-scale landslide due to weathering, and finally, only the top of Shin-Fuji remained.
There are ten known eruptions that can be traced to reliable records.

Current eruptive danger 

Following the 2011 Tōhoku earthquake, there was speculation in the media that the shock may induce volcanic unrest at Mount Fuji. In September 2012, mathematical models created by the National Research Institute for Earth Science and Disaster Prevention (NRIESDP) suggested that the pressure in Mount Fuji's magma chamber could be 1.6 megapascals higher than it was before its last eruption in 1707. This was interpreted by some media outlets to mean that an eruption of Mount Fuji could be imminent. However, since there is no known method of directly measuring the pressure of a volcano's magma chamber, indirect calculations of the type used by NRIESDP are speculative and unverifiable. Other indicators suggestive of heightened eruptive danger, such as active fumaroles and recently discovered faults, are typical occurrences at this type of volcano.

Aokigahara forest 

The forest at the northwest base of the mountain is named Aokigahara. Folk tales and legends tell of ghosts, demons, Yūrei and Yōkai haunting the forest, and in the 19th century, Aokigahara was one of many places poor families abandoned the very young and the very old. Aokigahara is the world's third most popular suicide location after San Francisco's Golden Gate Bridge and the Nanjing Yangtze River Bridge. Since the 1950s, more than 500 people have died in the forest, mostly suicides. Approximately 30 suicides have been counted yearly, with a high of nearly 80 bodies in 2002. The recent increase in suicides prompted local officials to erect signs that attempt to convince individuals experiencing suicidal intent to re-think their desperate plans, and sometimes these messages have proven effective. The numbers of suicides in the past creates an allure that has persisted across the span of decades.

Many of these hikers mark their travelled routes by leaving coloured plastic tapes behind as they pass, causing concerns from prefectural officials with regard to the forest's ecosystem.

Adventuring

Transportation 
The closest airport with scheduled international service is Mt. Fuji Shizuoka Airport. It opened in June 2009. The major international airports serving Tokyo, Tokyo International Airport (Haneda Airport) in Tokyo and Narita International Airport in Chiba are approximately three hours and 15 minutes from Mount Fuji.

Climbing routes 

Approximately 300,000 people climbed Mount Fuji in 2009. The most popular period for people to hike up Mount Fuji is from July to August, while huts and other facilities are operating and the weather is warmest. Buses to the trail heads typically used by climbers start running on July 1. Climbing from October to May is very strongly discouraged, after a number of high-profile deaths and severe cold weather. Most Japanese climb the mountain at night in order to be in a position at or near the summit when the sun rises. The morning light is called  goraikō, "arrival of light".

There are four major routes to the summit, each has numbered stations along the way. They are (clockwise, starting North): Kawaguchiko, Subashiri, Gotemba, and Fujinomiya routes. Climbers usually start at the fifth stations, as these are reachable by car or by bus. The summit is the tenth station on each trail. The stations on different routes are at different elevations; the highest fifth station is located at Fujinomiya, followed by Yoshida, Subashiri, and Gotemba. There are four additional routes from the foot of the mountain: Shojiko, Yoshida, Suyama, and Murayama routes.

Even though it has only the second-highest fifth stations, the Yoshida route is the most-popular route because of its large parking area and many large mountain huts where a climber can rest or stay. During the summer season, most Mount Fuji climbing tour buses arrive there. The next-popular is the Fujinomiya route, which has the highest fifth station, followed by Subashiri and Gotemba. The ascent from the new fifth station can take anywhere between five and seven hours while the descent can take from three to four hours.

Even though most climbers do not climb the Subashiri and Gotemba routes, many descend these because of their ash-covered paths. From the seventh station to near the fifth station, one could run down these ash-covered paths in approximately 30 minutes. Besides these routes, there are tractor routes along the climbing routes. These tractor routes are used to bring food and other materials to huts on the mountain. Because the tractors usually take up most of the width of these paths and they tend to push large rocks from the side of the path, the tractor paths are off-limits to the climbers on sections that are not merged with the climbing or descending paths. Nevertheless, one can sometimes see people riding mountain bikes along the tractor routes down from the summit. This is particularly risky, as it becomes difficult to control speed and may send some rocks rolling along the side of the path, which may hit other people.

The four routes from the foot of the mountain offer historical sites. The Murayama is the oldest Mount Fuji route and the Yoshida route still has many old shrines, teahouses, and huts along its path. These routes are gaining popularity recently and are being restored, but climbing from the foot of the mountain is still relatively uncommon. Also, bears have been sighted along the Yoshida route.

Huts at and above the fifth stations are usually staffed during the climbing season, but huts below fifth stations are not usually staffed for climbers. The number of open huts on routes are proportional to the number of climbers—Yoshida has the most while Gotemba has the fewest. The huts along the Gotemba route also tend to start later and close earlier than those along the Yoshida route. Also, because Mount Fuji is designated as a national park, it is illegal to camp above the fifth station.

There are eight peaks around the crater at the summit. The highest point in Japan, Ken-ga-mine, is where the Mount Fuji Radar System used to be (it was replaced by an automated system in 2004). Climbers are able to visit each of these peaks.

Paragliding 
Paragliders take off in the vicinity of the fifth station Gotemba parking lot, between Subashiri and Hōei-zan peak on the south side of the mountain, in addition to several other locations, depending on wind direction. Several paragliding schools use the wide sandy/grassy slope between Gotemba and Subashiri parking lots as a training hill.

In culture

Shinto mythology 
In Shinto mythology, Kuninotokotachi (国之常立神?, Kuninotokotachi-no-Kami, in Kojiki)(国常立尊?, Kuninotokotachi-no-Mikoto, in Nihon Shoki) is one of the two gods born from "something like a reed that arose from the soil" when the earth was chaotic. According to the Nihon Shoki, Konohanasakuya-hime, wife of Ninigi, is the goddess of Mount Fuji, where Fujisan Hongū Sengen Taisha is dedicated for her.

In ancient times the mountain was worshipped from afar. The Asama shrine was set up at the foothills to ward off eruptions. In the Heian period (794–1185) volcanic activity subsided and Fuji was used as a base for Shugendō, a syncretic religion combining mountain worship and Buddhism. Worshippers began to climb the slopes and by the early 12th century, Matsudai Shonin had founded a temple on the summit.

Fuji-kō was an Edo period cult centred around the mountain founded by an ascetic named Hasegawa Kakugyō (1541–1646). The cult venerated the mountain as a female deity, and encouraged its members to climb it. In doing so they would be reborn, "purified and... able to find happiness." The cult waned in the Meiji period and although it persists to this day it has been subsumed into Shintō sects.

Buddhism 
The Buddhist Hokkeko believers of Nichiren Shoshu sect piously claim that the Dai Gohonzon mandala grants supernatural protection from the Buddhist deities against possible volcanic eruption of Mount Fuji through the daylight morning ritual of Ushitora Gongyo.

Popular culture 
As a national symbol of the country, the mountain has been depicted in various art media such as paintings, woodblock prints (such as Hokusai's Thirty-six Views of Mount Fuji and 100 Views of Mount Fuji from the 1830s), poetry, music, theater, film, manga, anime, pottery and even Kawaii subculture.

Before its explosive eruption in 1980, Mount St. Helens was once known as "The Fuji of America," for its striking resemblance to Mount Fuji. Mount Taranaki / Mount Egmont in New Zealand is also said to bear a resemblance to Mount Fuji, and for this reason has been used as a stand-in for the mountain in films and television.

See also 
List of mountains and hills of Japan by height
100 Famous Japanese Mountains
List of three-thousanders in Japan
Fuji-Hakone-Izu National Park
List of World Heritage sites in Japan
List of elevation extremes by country
, Araido Island (阿頼度島), Kuril Islands
Mount St. Helens, nicknamed "Fuji-san of America" prior to its 1980 eruption
Sacred mountains
BOAC Flight 911, a British Boeing 707 plane which crashed on the mountain in 1966.

References

External links 

Fujisan (Mount Fuji) – Smithsonian Institution: Global Volcanism Program
Comprehensive Database of Archaeological Site Reports in Japan, Nara National Research Institute for Cultural Properties

 
Volcanoes of Honshū
Active volcanoes
Izu–Bonin–Mariana Arc
Mountains of Shizuoka Prefecture
Mountains of Yamanashi Prefecture
Natural monuments of Japan
Pleistocene stratovolcanoes
Pleistocene Asia
Sacred mountains
Sacred mountains of Japan
Special Places of Scenic Beauty
Stratovolcanoes of Japan
Subduction volcanoes
Triple junctions
VEI-5 volcanoes
Tourist attractions in Shizuoka Prefecture
Tourist attractions in Yamanashi Prefecture
Extreme points of Japan
World Heritage Sites in Japan
Volcanoes of Shizuoka Prefecture
Volcanoes of Yamanashi Prefecture
Articles containing video clips
Highest points of countries
Internal territorial disputes of Japan